This is a list of KrAZ vehicle models:

KrAZ vehicles
KrAZ